Rye whiskey can refer to two different, but related, types of whiskey:
 American rye whiskey, which is similar to bourbon whiskey, but must be distilled from at least 51 percent rye grain
 Canadian whisky, which is often referred to as (and often labelled as) rye whisky for historical reasons, although it may or may not actually include any rye grain in its production process.

American rye whiskey

In the United States, rye whiskey is, by law, made from a mash of at least 51 percent rye. (The other ingredients in the mash are usually corn and malted barley.) It is distilled to no more than 160 U.S. proof (80% abv) and aged in charred, new oak barrels. The whiskey must be put in the barrels at no more than 125 proof (62.5% abv). Rye whiskey that has been aged for at least two years and has not been blended with other spirits may be further designated as straight, as in "straight rye whiskey".

History
Rye whiskey was historically the prevalent whiskey in the northeastern states, especially Pennsylvania and Maryland. Pittsburgh was the center of rye whiskey production in the late 1700s and early 1800s. By 1808, Allegheny County, Pennsylvania farmers were selling one half barrel for each man, woman and child in the country. By the 1880s, Joseph F. Sinnott's distillery, Moore and Sinnott, located in Monongahela, Pennsylvania, was the single largest producer of rye whiskey, with a capacity of 30,000 barrels a year.

Rye whiskey largely disappeared after Prohibition. A few brands, such as Old Overholt, survived, although by the late 1960s former Pennsylvania brands like Old Overholt were being distilled mostly in Kentucky.

In the early 21st century, an expanding number of rye whiskey brands are produced by Campari Group (Wild Turkey Rye), Diageo (George Dickel Rye and Bulleit Rye), Heaven Hill (Pikesville Rye and Rittenhouse Rye), Beam Suntory (Old Overholt and Jim Beam Rye), The Sazerac Company (Col. E. H. Taylor, Sazerac Rye, and Thomas H. Handy), and various smaller companies. A particularly large producer is MGP of Indiana (formerly known as Lawrenceburg Distillers Indiana), which is a distiller for many brands that are marketed by others (including some of the large companies previously listed).

Rye whiskey has been undergoing a small but growing revival in the US. Since the beginning of the 21st century, more producers have been experimenting with rye whiskey, and several now market aged rye whiskey. For example, Brown-Forman began production of a Jack Daniel's rye whiskey and released unaged and lightly aged versions as limited editions. A reconstructed distillery at Mount Vernon (the estate of George Washington) sells a rye that is similar to the whiskey Washington made.

Differences between rye and bourbon
Rye grain is known for imparting what many call a spicy or fruity flavor to the whiskey. Bourbon, distilled from at least 51% corn, is noticeably sweeter and tends to be more full-bodied than rye. As bourbon gained popularity beyond the southern United States, bartenders increasingly substituted it for rye in cocktails such as the whiskey sour, Manhattan, and Old Fashioned, which were originally made with rye. All other things being equal, the character of the cocktail will be drier (i.e., less sweet) with rye.

Canadian rye whisky

Canadian whisky is often referred to as "rye whisky" because historically much of the content was from rye. There is no requirement for rye to be used to make Canadian whisky, and the labels "Canadian whisky", "Canadian rye whisky" and "Rye whisky" are all legally permitted, regardless of the actual composition, provided the whiskies "possess the aroma, taste and character generally attributed to Canadian whisky".

In modern practice, most Canadian whiskies are blended to achieve this character, primarily consisting of a high-proof base whisky typically made from corn or wheat and aged in used barrels combined with a small amount of flavoring whisky made from a rye mash and distilled to a lower proof. In some cases, the corn-to-rye ratio may be as high as 9:1. There are a few exceptions, such as Alberta Premium and Canadian Club Chairman's Select, which are made from 100% rye mash.

This requirement differs from regulations for U.S. blended whiskey, in which the bulk base spirits are not required to be aged.

Rye elsewhere
Scotch whisky distillers were using rye as a mash ingredient for grain whisky in the 18th century. By the 2020s, tariffs on biogas producers had led to an increase in availability of the grain, leading modern distilleries to begin experimenting with the new raw material.

See also
 List of whisky brands
 Outline of whisky
 Starka

References